Woltermann Memorial Airport  is a public use airport located southeast of Columbus, a city in Stillwater County, Montana, United States. Owned by the city and county, it was formerly known as Columbus Airport.

This airport is included in the National Plan of Integrated Airport Systems for 2011–2015, which categorized it as a general aviation facility.

Facilities and aircraft 
Woltermann Memorial Airport covers an area of 120 acres (49 ha) at an elevation of 3,575 feet (1,090 m) above mean sea level. It has one runway designated 10/28 with an asphalt surface measuring 3,814 by 75 feet (1,163 x 23 m).

For the 12-month period ending August 2, 2012, the airport had 9,050 aircraft operations, an average of 24 per day: 97% general aviation and 3% air taxi. At that time there were 29 aircraft based at this airport: 97% single-engine and 3% helicopter.

See also 
 List of airports in Montana

References

External links 
 Aerial image as of August 1997 from USGS The National Map
 

Airports in Montana
Transportation in Stillwater County, Montana
Buildings and structures in Stillwater County, Montana